HMS Searcher was a Ruler-class escort carrier of the Royal Navy. Built in Seattle as a Bogue-class, she was transferred to the United Kingdom under Lend-Lease. Launched in 1942 she served until 29 November 1945. She was sold into merchant service and renamed Captain Theo. In 1966, she was renamed again to Oriental Banker and was finally scrapped in Taiwan in 1976.

Design and description
Ruler-class ships were larger and had a greater aircraft capacity than the preceding American-built escort carrier classes, and were laid down as escort carriers, not converted from merchant ships.

Her armament consisted of two 4"/50, 5"/38 or 5"/51 Dual Purpose guns in single mounts, sixteen 40 mm Bofors anti-aircraft guns in twin mounts and twenty 20 mm Oerlikon anti-aircraft guns in single mounts. They had a maximum aircraft capacity of twenty-four aircraft which could be a mixture of Grumman Martlet, Vought F4U Corsair or Hawker Sea Hurricane fighter aircraft and Fairey Swordfish or Grumman Avenger anti-submarine aircraft.

Wartime Service
From 1943 Searcher operated mainly around the UK as a Fighter Carrier. In late December 1943 she provided Atlantic convoy escort, escorting ships to the US, and arriving at Norfolk on 2 January 1944. She participated in the attacks on the German battleship Tirpitz as part of the Home Fleet Strike force of Operation Tungsten, during which her role was to provide fighter cover. In August 1944 she took part in Operation Dragoon, the Allied invasion of Southern France.

Grumman TBF Avenger torpedo bombers escorted by Grumman F4F Wildcat fighters attacked the U-boat crew barracks ship MS Black Watch, the submarine tender MS Senja and the floating flak battery Thetis (the former Norwegian coastal defence ship ). U-711 was alongside Black Watch when she was sunk in position  by bombs aimed at Black Watch. Black Watch and Senja were also sunk. This was the last sinking of a U-Boat by the Fleet Air Arm, and the final air-raid of the war in Europe.

Searcher was sent to the Far East as part of the British Pacific Fleet but arrived in mid-August as the war ended.

Commanding officers

Return to the US Navy
Searcher was returned to the US Navy under the terms of the Lend-Lease arrangement on 29 November 1945 and was listed for disposal on 7 February 1946.

Merchant Service
The decommissioned escort carrier was sold to J & A T Vatis, a Greek shipping company, and renamed Captain Theo in 1952. The ship was sold again in 1966 to the Chinese shipping magnate Tung Chao Yung, becoming Oriental Banker.

Fate
Oriental Banker was scrapped at Kaohsiung in Taiwan, commencing on 21 April 1976.

Notes

The Attack on 'Black Watch (Harald Isachsen, Harstad, 2009,   -  in Norwegian)

 

Type C3-S-A1 ships of the Royal Navy
Ships built in Seattle
1942 ships
World War II aircraft carriers of the United Kingdom
Attacker-class escort carriers
Cargo ships of Greece